Henadzi Yurievich Aliashchuk also written as Gennady Oleshchuk (born 29 June 1975) is a retired male weightlifter from Belarus, who competed in the men's featherweight class weight (– 62 kg) at the 2000 Summer Olympics and won a bronze medal. He was born in Babruysk.

References

External links
 
 
 
 «Знал, что принимаю допинг» 
 Biography of Henadzi Aliashchuk 

1975 births
Living people
People from Babruysk
Belarusian male weightlifters
Olympic weightlifters of Belarus
Weightlifters at the 2000 Summer Olympics
Olympic bronze medalists for Belarus
Olympic medalists in weightlifting
Doping cases in weightlifting
Belarusian sportspeople in doping cases
Medalists at the 2000 Summer Olympics
European Weightlifting Championships medalists
World Weightlifting Championships medalists
Sportspeople from Mogilev Region